Jeffrey Alan Dellenbach (born February 14, 1963) is a former American football center in the National Football League (NFL) for the Miami Dolphins, New England Patriots, Green Bay Packers, and the Philadelphia Eagles. He was a member of the Green Bay Packers when they won Super Bowl XXXI.  Dellenbach played college football at the University of Wisconsin–Madison and was drafted by the Dolphins in the fourth round of the 1985 NFL Draft.

Dellenbach served as the head coach at Boca Raton (Fla.) High School, but resigned in May 2014 after just one season. “I’m pursuing other interests,” Dellenbach wrote in a text message. In Dellenbach’s only season as head coach, the Bobcats finished with a 4-6 record and missed the playoffs in 2013. Before arriving at Boca Raton, the 51-year-old spent two seasons at Plantation-American Heritage and won two district titles. In three seasons at Coconut Creek-North Broward Prep, Dellenbach posted a 22-11 record. He also served as an assistant offensive line coach for the Dolphins from 2003-2005.

In July 2016, Dellenbach was hired as the head football coach at Saint John Paul II Academy. (FL), replacing Willie Snead.

References

1963 births
Living people
American football offensive linemen
Miami Dolphins players
New England Patriots players
Green Bay Packers players
Philadelphia Eagles players
Wisconsin Badgers football players
Sportspeople from Wausau, Wisconsin
Players of American football from Wisconsin